Glenn Robertson (born 1949 or 1950)  is a former Canadian politician, who served as a New Democratic Member of the Legislative Assembly of British Columbia from 1996 to 2001, representing the riding of North Island.

Robertson was born in Montreal and moved to British Columbia in 1973. Before entering politics, he worked in the forest industry for 23 years. Robertson lived in Port McNeill.

References

Year of birth missing (living people)
Living people
Anglophone Quebec people
British Columbia New Democratic Party MLAs
Members of the Executive Council of British Columbia
Politicians from Montreal